Karavelova Point or Nos Karavelova ( is on the northeast coast of Varna Peninsula, Livingston Island in the South Shetland Islands, Antarctica forming the south side of the entrance to Lister Cove.  It is named after Ekaterina Karavelova (1860–1947), translator, author and woman activist.

Location

Maps
 L.L. Ivanov et al. Antarctica: Livingston Island and Greenwich Island, South Shetland Islands. Scale 1:100000 topographic map. Sofia: Antarctic Place-names Commission of Bulgaria, 2005.
 L.L. Ivanov. Antarctica: Livingston Island and Greenwich, Robert, Snow and Smith Islands. Scale 1:120000 topographic map.  Troyan: Manfred Wörner Foundation, 2009.

External links
 Karavelova Point. SCAR Composite Antarctic Gazetteer.
 Bulgarian Antarctic Gazetteer. Antarctic Place-names Commission. (details in Bulgarian, basic data in English)

External links
 Karavelova Point. Copernix satellite image

Headlands of Livingston Island